Juan Daniel Álvez Ortíz (born August 21, 1983) is a Uruguayan footballer who plays for Fénix of the Primera Division in Uruguay.

External links
 
 
 Profile at Tenfield Digital 

1983 births
Living people
Uruguayan footballers
Liverpool F.C. (Montevideo) players
Montevideo Wanderers F.C. players
Peñarol players
Centro Atlético Fénix players
Association football defenders